The 1937 New Hampshire Wildcats football team was an American football team that represented the University of New Hampshire as a member of the New England Conference during the 1937 college football season. In its  first year under head coach George Sauer, the team compiled a 7–1 record, outscoring their opponents 144–31. Five of the team's wins were by shutout. The team played its home games at Lewis Field (also known as Lewis Stadium) in Durham, New Hampshire.

Sauer was named head coach of the Wildcats on July 19, 1937, succeeding William "Butch" Cowell who had coached the team from 1915 through 1936.

Schedule

The game in Manchester against St. Anselm was attended by Governor of New Hampshire Francis P. Murphy.

Wildcat Fritz Rosinski set a team record (which still stands) of 11 interceptions in a season.

Notes

References

New Hampshire
New Hampshire Wildcats football seasons
New Hampshire Wildcats football